Brendon Miller (born Glendon Crain; August 30, 1976) is an American pornographic actor and musician.

Career

Music
Prior to his career as a pornographic actor, Miller was a drummer for several bands. He began his music career with The Feds, with whom he recorded five albums, leaving in 2001. He then played with John 5's band Loser, but their debut album was not released due to John 5's involvement with Rob Zombie's live band. Miller briefly left Loser during the recording of "Disposable Sunshine", where he was replaced by Elias Andra. Miller also played with Jason Christopher's band New Dead Radio, and their only album was released in 2005. The same year, he formed All Hail the Yeti with Connor Garritty and KJ Duval, but left to join Godhead full-time. In 2008, Miller joined Hollywood Undead as a touring member, where he was given the stage name "Biscuitz". He later twice rejoined All Hail the Yeti, and in 2016, filled in for Red Tide Rising drummer Matt Guerin, who was celebrating his honeymoon.

Miller is also the lead singer of The Wicked Outlaws. In addition to singing, he is also a songwriter. In 2015, he created a country rock song and music video, "On the Run", for the pornographic film Wanted.

Pornography
In 2012, Miller portrayed The Joker in The Dark Knight XXX: An Axel Braun Parody, directed by Axel Braun He won the 2013 XBIZ Award for Best Supporting Actor for his role in the film. Although he retired from performing in 2014 to focus on his music career, he returned to the industry in 2015 to reprise his role as the Joker for Batman v Superman XXX: An Axel Braun Parody.

Miller has edited approximately half of the movies that Stormy Daniels has produced.

Personal life
Miller was married to Stormy Daniels from 2015 to 2018. They have a daughter born in January 2011. In July 2018, Miller filed for divorce on the grounds alleging Daniels' adultery, and requested full custody of their daughter.

Awards and nominations

References

External links

 
 
 

1976 births
American country rock singers
American male pornographic film actors
American male singer-songwriters
Living people
Male actors from Dallas
Male actors from Kansas City, Kansas
Musicians from Dallas
Musicians from Kansas City, Kansas
Pornographic film actors from Kansas
Pornographic film actors from Texas
Singer-songwriters from Texas
21st-century American singers
Country musicians from Texas
21st-century American male singers
Singer-songwriters from Kansas